Andrés Ricardo Aimar Giordano (born 18 November 1981) is an Argentine former footballer who played as a midfielder.

Club career
Born in Río Cuarto, Córdoba, Aimar started his professional career with Club Atlético River Plate, but could only amass three first-team appearances over two seasons. In 2003–04, he played for fellow Argentine Primera División club Estudiantes de La Plata.

After an unassuming spell in the Belgian Third Division with Union Namur Fosses-La-Ville, Aimar returned to his country, joining Club Atlético Belgrano. He moved abroad again shortly after, spending the following months with Israel's F.C. Ashdod and finishing the campaign with another team in Argentina, Primera B Nacional's Club Atlético Aldosivi.

For 2008–09, Aimar moved overseas for the third time, again having no impact whatsoever as he only appeared in four Segunda Liga matches (out of a possible 30) for Portuguese side G.D. Estoril Praia.

Aimar signed with hometown club Estudiantes de Río Cuarto in 2009, where he remained until his retirement nine years later. Immediately afterwards, he was appointed its general manager.

Personal life
Aimar's older brother, Pablo, was also a footballer and a midfielder. Having also started professionally with River Plate he played for, amongst others, Valencia CF and S.L. Benfica, also appearing for the Argentina national team in two FIFA World Cups.

References

External links

1981 births
Living people
People from Río Cuarto, Córdoba
Argentine footballers
Association football midfielders
Argentine Primera División players
Primera Nacional players
Club Atlético River Plate footballers
Estudiantes de La Plata footballers
Club Atlético Belgrano footballers
Aldosivi footballers
Estudiantes de Río Cuarto footballers
Israeli Premier League players
F.C. Ashdod players
Liga Portugal 2 players
G.D. Estoril Praia players
Argentine expatriate footballers
Expatriate footballers in Belgium
Expatriate footballers in Israel
Expatriate footballers in Portugal
Argentine expatriate sportspeople in Belgium
Argentine expatriate sportspeople in Israel
Argentine expatriate sportspeople in Portugal
Sportspeople from Córdoba Province, Argentina